Lenka Lichtenberg is a Canadian singer, composer, songwriter, animal rights activist and cantorial soloist of Czech-Jewish descent. She sings in Czech, English, French, Hebrew, and Yiddish.

Biography 
She was born in Prague, into a family of Jewish origin. Most of her mother's family was murdered during the Holocaust. At the age of nine, Lichtenberg became an actress at the Music Theatre Semafor in Prague. She moved to Denmark, where she studied music at Aarhus Universitet and worked as a club singer.

In 1980s, Lichtenberg moved to Canada and settled in Vancouver, where she continued her studies at the University of British Columbia (B.Ed, music, French), and sang in a rock band. She received her Masters Degree in Ethnomusicology at York University in Toronto.

Lichtenberg performs internationally at Jewish culture festivals, folk and world music festivals and concert series. She has released seven solo albums and numerous collaborative projects. She is a regular Shabbat service leader at the Darchei Noam Congregation in Toronto.

Director Jaroslav Hovorka made a documentary film for Czech TV about her, Lenka Lichtenberg: Pisne pro ozivle steny (2011).

Lichtenberg has received numerous nominations and awards. In 2008 and 2012 she was the recipient of the Canadian Folk Music Award. Her latest project Thieves of Dreams placed at #36  at the Top 2022 Albums on World Music Charts Europe.

Discography 
 1999 - Deep Inside
 2003 - Open the Gate
 2006 - Pashtes with Brian Katz
 2010 - Fray
 2012 - Bridges with Roula Said
 2012 - Songs for the Breathing Walls
 2013 - Embrace
 2014 - Lullabies from Exile with Yair Dalal
 2016-  Live in America
 2017 - Yiddish Journey (Arc Music Productions)
 2018 - Masaryk (Arc Music Productions)
 2019 - Lenkkodek' with Andrew McPherson
 2022-  Thieves of Dreams

References

External links 
 

Czechoslovak emigrants to Canada
Jewish Canadian musicians
Canadian people of Czech-Jewish descent
Canadian women singers
Musicians from Prague
Musicians from Toronto
Musicians from Vancouver
Yiddish-language singers
Hebrew-language singers
University of British Columbia alumni
Canadian world music musicians
Canadian Folk Music Award winners
Canadian ethnomusicologists
Canadian animal rights activists
Canadian women activists
Jewish women singers
Jewish women composers
Women ethnomusicologists
Jewish Canadian actresses
Jewish women activists
Juno Award for Global Music Album of the Year winners